Seiichi Shirai(:ja:白井晟一) was a Japanese architect. His eccentric, mysterious and extremely refined architectural language made him highly esteemed in his native country of Japan.

Style
Seiichi Shirai's style is unique. His unexpected way of using exquisite and rare (in Japan) materials (marmor, brick, nature stone) make his buildings seem to be independent of their surrounding and at odds with the common Japanese architecture of this time. Nevertheless, there are European influences, evidence of his studies in Europe, as well as Japanese influences present in his work: Particular use of European classicist furniture and facades are reminiscent of Carlo Scarpa.

Works
NOA Building (1964), Shinwa Bank Computer Tower, Nagasaki (1974), Shōtō Museum of Art, Tokyo 1981, Shizuoka City Serizawa Keisuke Art Museum (1981).

References
Bart Lootsma:http://www.architekturtheorie.eu/?id=media_centre&sub_id=podcast&det_id=1&lang=DE&PHPSESSID=73a0b8bee3f624def067de6c1e2420a8&archive_id=251&cmd=start&PHPSESSID=73a0b8bee3f624def067de6c1e2420a8

1905 births
1983 deaths
20th-century Japanese architects